Kiernan is a surname of Irish origin and a unisex given name, and may refer to:

Surname 

 Ben Kiernan (born 1953), professor of history at Yale
 Caitlín R. Kiernan (born 1964), paleontologist and novelist
 Colm Kiernan (1931–2010), Australian historian
 Ford Kiernan (born 1962), Scottish comedian, actor and scriptwriter
 Francis Kiernan (1800–1874), Irish anatomist
 Greta Kiernan (1933-2023), American politician
 Ian Kiernan (1940–2018), Australian yachtsman and environmentalist
 Jerry Kiernan (1953–2021), Irish long-distance runner.
 John J. Kiernan (1847–1893), New York financial news pioneer and politician
 Kitty Kiernan (1893–1945), fiancée of Irish revolutionary leader Michael Collins
 Leanne Kiernan (born 1999), Irish soccer player, played for Ireland, Westham United, and Liverpool F.C.
 Mike Kiernan (born 1961), Irish rugby player, played for Dolphins, Ireland and the Lions
 Pat Kiernan (born 1968), Canadian-American TV host
 Patrick Kiernan (equestrian) (1929–2003), Irish equestrian at the 1956 Olympics
 Scarlett Kiernan, fictional character from Doctors
 Tom Kiernan (born 1939), Irish rugby player, played for Cork Constitution, Ireland and the Lions
 Victor Kiernan (1913–2009), British Marxist historian, translator of Urdu poetry
 Walter Kiernan (1902–1978), American writer and game show host

Given name 
Kiernan Dewsbury-Hall (born 1998), English footballer
Kiernan Dorney (1912 – 2007), decorated Australian surgeon
Kiernan Forbes (born 1988), South African rapper known as AKA
Kiernan Hughes-Mason (born 1991), English footballer
Kiernan Shipka (born 1999), American actress

See also
 McKiernan Clan
 McKernan (surname)
 McKiernan
 McTiernan
 McTernan
 Kernan (disambiguation)
 Tiernan

Surnames

Given names
English-language unisex given names